Unwrapped is the tenth studio solo album and twenty-fourth album overall by Cuban-American singer Gloria Estefan, released in 2003.  It was also her first English language studio album since 1998's gloria!.

Content 
The album is a departure in sound from Estefan's previous works. The album was recorded live, unlike any of her other studio albums. There is less reverb on Estefan's vocals, to create an intimate feeling. The album is acoustic and is designed to feel like an unplugged album. This is the first Estefan album to not feature a brass section.

Estefan worked with notable artists on the album; Stevie Wonder played harmonica and sang on "Into You," while Chrissie Hynde appeared on "One Name". "Hoy," which became one of Estefan's most successful singles, was written by Peruvian singer-composer Gian Marco and contains several Peruvian folk music elements.

The album uses the theme of unwrapping herself to the world in the lyrics, recording, and artwork. The picture on the back cover is actually Estefan's back. Next to the title, "Into You," there is a pink line that runs down to the bottom, which is the scar from her back surgery when she broke her back in 1990. The picture above the "I Will Always Need Your Love" lyrics is Gloria holding hands with her husband Emilio, for whom the song was written, likewise, the picture of the hand pointing to the lyrics to "You" is Gloria's daughter, Emily.

Promotion 
To promote the album, Estefan launched the American tour Live & Re-Wrapped Tour which was made after her Live & Unwrapped performances at Caesars Palace in Las Vegas.

In addition, Estefan released a remix EP under the name of Unwrapped: Remixes, the EP was a Bonus Promo CD that was available with purchase of the Live & Unwrapped DVD during Pay Per View broadcasts and purchases of the DVD at shows during the Live & Re-Wrapped Tour.

Track listing

Personnel
Adapted from AllMusic.

 Pedro Alfonso - violin
 Meredith Mora Arriaga - accordion
 Christopher Austopchuk - design direction
 Eric Barnard - hair stylist
 Tim Barnes - viola
 Kurt Berge - technical support
 Carlos "El Bola" Betancourt - cover art
 Edwin Bonilla - drums, percussion
 Susanne Cerha - art direction, design
 Vadim Chislov - assistant engineer
 Michael C. Collins - assistant engineer
 Mike Couzzi - engineer
 Kevin Dillon - project coordinator
 Luis Enrique - drums, guest artist, percussion
 Emilio Estefan, Jr. -   producer
 Gloria Estefan -   primary artist, producer
 John Falcone - arranger, bass,   string arrangements
 Jorge Felix - assistant engineer
 Trevor Fletcher - studio manager
 Richard Flieschman - viola
 Orlando J. Forte - violin
 Julie Gardner - engineer
 Chris Glansdorp - cello
 Arthur Hanlon - piano
 Ross Harbaugh - cello
 Kent Hertz - assistant engineer
 Chrissie Hynde - guest artist, vocals
 Claudio Jaffe - cello
 Sidney Jamila - make-Up
 Femi Jiya - engineer
 Steve Jones - digital editing
 Manu Katché - drums
 Sebastián Krys - arranger, cavaquinho, charango,  cuatro, engineer, lakota flute, mixing, producer, programming, quena, string arrangements, zampona
 Leyla Leeming - project coordinator
 Bob Ludwig - mastering
 Mei Mei Luo - violin
 Patrick Magee - assistant engineer
 José Juan Maldonado - project coordinator
 Tony Mardini - arranger
 Tom McWilliams - arranger, drums
 Steve Menezes - studio manager
 Susan Moyer - cello
 Scott ODonnell - viola
 Alfredo Oliva - concert master, violin
 Laszio Pap - violin
 Ruben Parra - studio manager
 Luis Pastor - bass
 Andy Pechenik - technical support
 Billie Pechenik - project coordinator
 Archie Pena - arranger, drums, percussion
 Marco Peña - hair stylist
 Daniel Ponce - assistant engineer
 Juan Rosario - assistant engineer
 Juan Antonio Salazar - conductor, orchestration, string arrangements
 Eric Schilling - engineer
 Jon Secada -   guest artist, background vocals
 Rafael Solano - drums, percussion
 Simon Soong - technical support
 Debra Spring - viola
 Ron Taylor - engineer, fender rhodes, mellotron, organ (hammond), piano, wurlitzer
 Ken Theis - assistant engineer, mixing assistant
 Alberto Tolot - cover portrait
 Peter Vargo - assistant
 Jose "Pepe" Velazquez - drums, drum technician
 Mario Vergel - stylist, typography
 Dan Warner - guitar, mandolin, tres
 Ryan Wolff - assistant engineer
 Stevie Wonder - guest artist, harmonica, vocal ad-Libs

Singles

Chart positions

Weekly Charts

Year-end Charts

Certifications and sales

Awards

Release history

References

External links 
 

2003 albums
Gloria Estefan albums
Albums produced by Emilio Estefan